David J. Lane (July 6, 1927 – February 13, 2020) was an American politician from the state of Massachusetts.

Personal life
He was an insurance agent, and was the Chairman of Hastings-Tapley Insurance Agency.  He graduated from Harvard University.

Political career
He served in the Massachusetts House of Representatives from 1973 to 1978, representing the 2nd Essex district. He served as Essex Town Moderator for 25 years.

Electoral history

Source:

1970 Massachusetts 2nd Essex District State Representative Republican Primary

1972 Massachusetts 2nd Essex District State Representative General Election

1974 Massachusetts 2nd Essex District State Representative General Election

1976 Massachusetts 2nd Essex District State Representative General Election

References

1927 births
2020 deaths
Members of the Massachusetts House of Representatives
Harvard University alumni